Raimondi's yellow finch (Sicalis raimondii) is a species of bird in the family Thraupidae. It is endemic to coastal Peru. Its natural habitats are subtropical or tropical dry shrubland and subtropical or tropical high-altitude shrubland.

References

Raimondi's yellow finch
Endemic birds of Peru
Raimondi's yellow finch
Raimondi's yellow finch
Taxonomy articles created by Polbot